The 1996–97 IHL season was the 52nd season of the International Hockey League, a North American minor professional league. 19 teams participated in the regular season, and the Detroit Vipers won the Turner Cup.

Offseason
The Atlanta Knights relocated to Quebec to become the Quebec Rafales due to the Omni being demolished to make room for Philips Arena.

The Peoria Rivermen organization left the IHL and joined the ECHL. The IHL franchise relocated to San Antonio to become the San Antonio Dragons.

After the Winnipeg Jets relocation to Phoenix to become the Phoenix Coyotes. The Minnesota Moose were purchased by a group by Canadian businessmen and relocated to Winnipeg, Manitoba to become the Manitoba Moose to provide a new tenant at Winnipeg Arena and keeping pro hockey in the city.

The Los Angeles Ice Dogs relocated to Long Beach retaining the same name due to poor attendance.

The San Francisco Spiders folded due to bankruptcy, poor attendance and issues with Cow Palace.

Regular season

Eastern Conference

Western Conference

Turner Cup playoffs

First round

(E1) Detroit Vipers vs. (E8) Michigan K-Wings

(W1) Long Beach Ice Dogs vs. (W8) Milwaukee Admirals

(E2) Orlando Solar Bears vs. (E7) Grand Rapids Griffins

(W2) San Antonio Dragons vs. (W7) Chicago Wolves

(E3) Indianapolis Ice vs. (E6) Cleveland Lumberjacks

(W3) Houston Aeros vs. (W6) Las Vegas Thunder

(E4) Cincinnati Cyclones vs. (E5) Québec Rafales

(W4) Utah Grizzlies vs. (W5) Kansas City Blades

Quarterfinals

(E1) Detroit Vipers vs. (E5) Québec Rafales

(W1) Long Beach Ice Dogs vs. (W4) Utah Grizzlies

(E2) Orlando Solar Bears vs. (E6) Cleveland Lumberjacks

(W2) San Antonio Dragons vs. (W3) Houston Aeros

Semifinals

(E1) Detroit Vipers vs. (E6) Cleveland Lumberjacks

(W1) Long Beach Ice Dogs vs. (W3) Houston Aeros

Turner Cup Finals

(E1) Detroit Vipers vs. (W1) Long Beach Ice Dogs

References

Bibliography

External links 
 Season 1996/97 on hockeydb.com

IHL
IHL
International Hockey League (1945–2001) seasons